Joan Shakespeare (married name Joan Hart; baptised 15 April 1569 – buried 4 November 1646) was the sister of William Shakespeare. She is the only member of the family whose known descendants continue down to the present day.

Life
Joan was Shakespeare's younger sister. She married a hatter named William Hart with whom she had four children, William (1600–1639), Mary (1603–1606), Thomas (1605–1661), and Michael (1608–1618).

Little is known about Joan's husband, William, apart from the fact that he was sued for debt in 1600 and 1601. He died in April 1616, and was buried 17 April, a week before William Shakespeare died. In his will her brother left her a legacy of £20, some clothing and the right to live in the western part of the double family house on Henley Street in Stratford for a nominal yearly rent of one shilling. She continued to reside there for the remainder of her life, dying at the age of 77.

Her son William never married. Her other descendants via Thomas lived in Stratford until 1806. Thomas inherited the Henley Street house known as Shakespeare's Birthplace. He had many descendants. By the 18th century Joan's descendants were identifying themselves as carrying the poet's family line. John Hart (1755–1800) was identified as "the 6th descendant of the poet Shakespeare" on his gravestone in Tewkesbury Abbey Churchyard, Gloucestershire.

In literature
In her essay A Room of One's Own, Virginia Woolf created a character, "Judith Shakespeare", supposed to be Shakespeare's sister. In fact Judith was his daughter. It is unknown whether this was a mistake or a deliberate conflation of the two women. In her story Shakespeare's sister is denied the education of her brother despite her obvious talent as a writer. When her father tries to marry her off, she runs away to join a theatre company but is ultimately rejected because of her sex. She becomes pregnant, is abandoned by her partner and commits suicide.

A teenage Joan appears in Laurie Lawlor's novel The Two Loves of Will Shakespeare (2006), in which she is presented as an aspirant poet who resents the restrictions placed on her as a woman. She writes sonnets, one of which her brother plagiarises. She is in love with Richard Field, but he pursues Anne Whateley. In Shakespeare's Will, Vern Thiessen's speculative biographical play about Anne Hathaway, Joan is a "bitch" who is constantly interfering in Anne's life.

Notes and references

Notes

References

Bibliography

External links
 Lin Van Hek of Difficult Women reads "Shakespeare's Sister" in Audio section.

Shakespeare family
1569 births
1646 deaths
People from Stratford-upon-Avon
16th-century English women
17th-century English women
17th-century English people